Telanga Kharia (1806 - 1880) was a great Indian tribal freedom fighter, who spearheaded a rebellion against the British Raj in Chotanagpur Region during 1850-1860. This rebellion was mainly against injustice, atrocities  and land alienation of tribal people which was a result of the British Rule. In the freedom struggle in Chotanagpur region, Telanga Kharia keeps an important figure along with other great freedom fighters like Vir Budhu Bhagat, Sidhu Kanhu, Birsa Munda, and Tilka Manjhi.

Early life
Telanga Kharia was born on 9 February 1806, at Murgu village, Gumla district of modern-day Jharkhand state. He belonged to Kharia tribe. His father's name was Thunya Kharia, who was a storekeeper at Chotanagpur Nagvansi king of Ratu. His mother's name was Peti Kharia. He married Ratni Kharia. Since childhood Telanga Kharia was very brave, honest and talkative by nature. He was involved in agriculture and animal-rearing. He developed keen interest on social and political issues as he often had chance to witness debates on these topics in the court of King of Ratu, where he used to go with his father. As an adult, he was well known for his revolutionary thoughts, reasoning skills and dedication to social service.

Movement against the British Raj
By the end of 1850, the British rule was established in Chotanagpur region. From ages, tribals have their own traditional autonomous self-governance rule of "Parha System" and they were almost free from any kind of outside interference. But this autonomous self-governance rule was disturbed and destroyed by the regulations imposed by the British Raj. Now, tribals had to pay revenue (malgujari) on their own land which they had been preparing and cultivating for centuries. When they failed to pay the land revenue, they were alienated from their own land in the hands of zamindars and Britishers. They were forced to live like a farm labourers. The middlemen like money lenders(sahukars) and zamindars didn't miss any single chance to loot common people. Apart from this, there existed a major problem of rural indebtedness. Poor people had to lose their land when they were unable to repay loans taken from village moneylenders. Many times, these debts were inherited from the past and increased with the passage of time. The plight of a common man was very miserable.

Telanga Kharia couldn't tolerate these injustice and atrocities and started the fight against the British rule and their middlemen. He started to organise people and create awareness among them. He created Jury Panchayat in many villages, which worked as self-governance rule parallel to the British rule. There were 13 Jury Panchayats formed by Telanga Kharia, which were spread across Sisai, Gumla, Basia, Simdega, Kumhari, Kolebira, Chainpur, Mahabuang and Bano area. He created "Akhara", where he used to give arms training to his followers. Their main weapons were sword and bow-arrow. He raised an army of around 900 to 1500 trained men. They used Guerrilla style of fighting. Telanga Kharia and his followers attacked Britishers, their middlemen and every other establishments of the British Raj. They also looted British banks and treasuries. During the period of 1850-1860, the rebellion led by Telanga Kharia against the British Raj in Chotanagpur region was at its peak. British government became very desperate to get rid of Telanga Kharia and wanted to suppress this uprising by any means. After knowing the intentions of the British government, Telanga Kharia became very alert. He began to control his operations mostly from hideouts inside the forest and unknown locations. Once, when Telanga Kharia was busy conducting a meeting at one village Jury Panchayat, the information about his presence at the meeting was passed by an agent of Zamindar to the Britishers. Soon, the meeting place was surrounded by the British army and then they arrested Telanga Kharia. He was first sent to Lohardaga Jail, and then to Calcutta Jail, where he got imprisonment of 18 years.

Release from the jail, revival of movement and death
When Telanga Kharia was released after completing his imprisonment in Calcutta jail, he again met his followers at Sisai Akhara. He started to revive the movement and made plans to strengthen the organisation. The information about his rebellion activities soon reached the ears of the Britishers and they started making plans to kill him. On 23 April 1880, when Telanga Kharia was offering daily prayer at Sisai Akhara before starting the training session, as soon as he bowed down for prayer, one of the British agents named Bodhan Singh, ambushed nearby that Akhara, opened fire at him.  After being hit by bullet, he  collapsed. Then, his followers immediately carried his body and moved towards the forest, so that Britishers couldn't find his body. After crossing the Koel river, they buried the body of Telanga Kharia at Soso Neem Toli village of Gumla district. Now this burial place is known as 'Telanga Topa Tand', which means 'burial ground of Telanga'. This place is considered sacred by the people of Chotanagpur, specially by the Kharia community. Every year on this day, his martyrdom is commemorated by the people. Also, one week long 'Sahid Telanga Mela' is organised on this occasion at Dhedhouli village of Gumla district. Telanga Kharia is still an inspiration to the millions in the region of Chotanagpur for his bravery, sacrifice and martyrdom.

References

1806 births
1880 deaths
Indian rebels
Indian revolutionaries
Indian independence activists from Jharkhand
People from Gumla district
Kharia people